The 2008 Heartland Championship was a provincial rugby union competition involving 12 teams from New Zealand split into two pools. Matches started on Saturday 23 August 2008 and ended with the final on 25 October.

The 2008 season was to be the last in its current format.  On 11 August 2008 the New Zealand Rugby Union announced that Tasman and Northland would be the two teams relegated from the Air New Zealand Cup after the completion of the 2008 season. Both teams failed to meet criteria which included financial stability, population, player training and development, playing history, and administration.  This might have meant that the Tasman union would have been split into its constituent Nelson Bays and Marlborough unions, and that the Heartland Championship would have needed to accommodate three further teams.  On 26 September 2008 the New Zealand Rugby Union rescinded this decision.

Wanganui won the Meads Cup and Poverty Bay won the Lochore Cup.  Each team has reached the respective cup final in all three years of the Heartland Championship.  Poverty Bay has won each Lochore Cup, while 2008 was Wanganui's first Meads Cup championship.

Standings
The 12 teams were split into two pools, with the top 3 from each pool after 5 rounds advancing to the Meads Cup round, whilst the bottom 3 from each pool played for the Lochore Cup.

Pool A

Pool B

Table notes
Pos = Table Position
Pld = Played
W   = Win (Worth 4 points)
D   = Draw (Worth 2 points)
L   = Loss (Worth 0 points)
PF   = For (Total points scored)
PA   = Against (Total points scored against)
PD = Points difference
BP1 = Bonus Point (1 Bonus Point will be awarded to any team that scores 4 tries or more regardless of win/loss/draw.)
BP2 = Bonus Point (1 Bonus Point will be awarded to the losing side if the loss is by 7 points or less.)
Pts = Progressive points tally

NB:
 It is possible to receive 2 bonus points in a loss.
 In the event of a tie on points, the higher ranked team is decided on the basis of who won when they met in pool play. If they remain tied, then it is decided by points differential.

Fixtures and results

Round 1

Round 2

Round 3

This was the first time Buller had beaten Wairarapa Bush at Masterton in the history of the two unions' meetings.

Round 4

Round 5

Buller wins the 2008 Rundle Cup

Meads and Lochore Cups

Standings

Lochore Cup Pool

Meads Cup Pool

Fixtures and results

Round 6

Round 7

Round 8

Knockout stage

Lochore Cup

Semifinals

Final

Meads Cup

Semifinals

Final

See also
Air New Zealand Cup
2008 Air New Zealand Cup

References

External links
 Official Website

Heartland Championship
3
Heart